Pfitzneriana olivescens is a moth of the family Hepialidae. It is found in Colombia and Bolivia.

References

Moths described in 1914
Hepialidae